is a former justice of the Supreme Court of Japan. She was the second woman in history to serve in that role.

She attended International Christian University and became a bureaucrat in the Ministry of Health and Welfare after graduation. She was appointed as head of Japan's social insurance system in 1994, and as ambassador to the Republic of Ireland in 1998. In 2001, she was appointed to the Supreme Court.

In September 2008, Yokoo resigned two years and seven months prior to the mandatory retirement age of 70. Ryuko Sakurai replaced Yokoo.

References 

1941 births
Living people
Ambassadors of Japan to Ireland
Japanese women diplomats
Supreme Court of Japan justices
Japanese women judges
International Christian University alumni
Japanese women ambassadors